Vasilios Katsaros (born 20 October 2000) is a Greek professional footballer who plays as a left-back.

References

2000 births
Living people
Greek footballers
Super League Greece 2 players
Gamma Ethniki players
Platanias F.C. players
Irodotos FC players
Association football defenders
Footballers from Arta, Greece